Tolka Row was an Irish drama serial set in a fictional housing estate on the northside of Dublin. Based on Maura Laverty's play of the same name, Tolka Row was first broadcast on 3 January 1964 and aired weekly for five series until it ended on 31 May 1968.

As Telefís Éireann's first venture into soap operas, Tolka Row quickly became a staple of the new television station's schedule and set the pace for all future home-produced serials. Its popularity also resulted in the station developing a second soap opera, The Riordans, in 1965.

Tolka Row is similar in format to the long-running British soap Coronation Street, from which it borrows its main premise (the everyday life of a number of neighbours). The show was centred on the Nolans, a typical working-class Dublin family, and their neighbours, the Feeneys. All episodes were filmed in studio at Telefís Éireann's Television Centre in Donnybrook, Dublin.

Cast

 Jack Nolan – Des Perry
 Rita Nolan – May Oliss
 Seán Nolan – Jim Bartley
 Statia Nolan-Doyle – Iris Lawler/Sheila O'Sullivan
 Oliver Feeney – John Molloy
 Assumpta Feeney – Aileen Harte
 Concepta Feeney – Virginia Cole
 Queenie Butler – May Cluskey
 Mr. Pender – Ritchie Stewart
 Harry Allen – Martin Dempsey
 Andy Kinnear – Gerry Alexander
 Peggy Kinnear – Laurie Morton
 Gabby Doyle – John McDarby
 Paddy Moore – Paddy Long
 Mrs. Moore – Úna McCourt
 Molly Ryan – Patricia Martin
 Jim "Beardie" Toomey – Andrew Irvine

Production

Broadcast format

During its entire four-year run Tolka Row remained at the centre of Telefís Éireann's prime time schedule. The pilot episode was broadcast at 19:20 on Friday, 3 January 1964. The first two series aired once a week on Fridays at that time. The third series moved to Sunday evenings where it usually aired at 19:45. The last two series returned to Friday evenings with a broadcast time of 20:00.  Every episode was pre-recorded in black and white before the broadcast date.

Sets

For all five series, the complete set of Tolka Row (house interiors and exteriors) was erected inside Studio 1 of Telefís Éireann's Television Centre in Dublin. Sets were constructed and removed on an ad hoc basis. There are a number of reasons for the use of an indoor studio; the main one being that the infancy of production techniques at the time did not allow easy recording and editing of sequences filmed in different locations. In spite of this some scenes were filmed on location in such places as Dublin Airport.

References

1964 Irish television series debuts
1968 Irish television series endings
1960s Irish television series
Irish television soap operas
RTÉ original programming
Fictional streets and roads